is a Japanese football player. He plays for Vegalta Sendai in loan of V-Varen Nagasaki.

Career
Takumi Nagura joined J3 League club FC Ryukyu in 2017. 

In January 2018, after just one season in Okinawa, he opted to sign for newly-promoted J1's team V-Varen Nagasaki.

Club statistics
Updated to 15 September 2022.

References

External links
Profile at V-Varen Nagasaki
Profile at Vegalta Sendai

1998 births
Living people
Association football people from Tokyo
Japanese footballers
J1 League players
J2 League players
J3 League players
FC Ryukyu players
V-Varen Nagasaki players
Association football midfielders